Charles Bingham, 1st Earl of Lucan (22 September 1735 – 29 March 1799), known as Sir Charles Bingham, 7th Baronet, from 1750 until 1776, was an Irish peer and politician.

Background 
He was the second son of Sir John Bingham, 5th Baronet, and his wife Anne Vesey, daughter of Agmondesham Vesey. In 1750, Bingham succeeded his older brother John as baronet.

Career 
Bingham was appointed High Sheriff of Mayo in 1756. He was elected as Member of Parliament for both Castlebar and Mayo in 1761, and chose to sit for the latter. He was returned to the Irish House of Commons until 1776, when he was elevated to the Peerage of Ireland as Baron Lucan, of Castlebar in the County of Mayo. As his title enabled him only to take a seat in the Irish House of Lords, Bingham was not restricted from entering the British House of Commons for Northampton in 1782, representing it until two years later. In 1795, Bingham was further ennobled in the Peerage of Ireland as Earl of Lucan, of Castlebar in the County of Mayo.

Family

On 25 August 1760, he married Margaret Smith, daughter of Sir James Smith, at Bath, Somerset, and by her he had four daughters and a son, among which:
 Richard Bingham, 2nd Earl of Lucan;
 Lady Lavinia Bingham, who married The 2nd Earl Spencer;
 Lady Anne Bingham
Lady Margaret Lindsey; her daughter was Margaret Grey Porter
John A. Bingham
Lord Lucan died, aged 63, at Charles Street, Mayfair, London, and was succeeded in his titles by his only son Richard.

References

1735 births
1799 deaths
British MPs 1780–1784
Peers of Ireland created by George III
Irish MPs 1761–1768
Irish MPs 1769–1776
Members of the Parliament of Great Britain for English constituencies
Members of the Parliament of Ireland (pre-1801) for County Mayo constituencies
Politicians from County Mayo
High Sheriffs of Mayo
Charles
Bingham Baronets, of Castlebar